Jason "Jace" Alexander (born April 7, 1964) is an American former television director, actor, and convicted sex offender from New York City. In 2015, Alexander was arrested for the downloading and file sharing of child pornography, and later pled guilty to one count of promoting a sexual performance by a child and one count of possessing an obscene sexual performance by a child.

Career

Acting
After attending New York University, Alexander began his professional career as the stage manager of a 1983 Broadway revival of The Caine Mutiny Court Martial, in which he also played a small role. Alexander appeared on stage in I'm Not Rappaport, Six Degrees of Separation and the Stephen Sondheim musical Assassins, in which he portrayed Lee Harvey Oswald. His screen roles include City of Hope, Love and a .45, Matewan, Eight Men Out, Crocodile Dundee II and Clueless.

Directing
In the early 1990s, Alexander studied at the American Film Institute, where he became interested in directing. His television credits include 32 episodes of Law & Order (on which his stepfather Ed Sherin served as an executive producer) and 18 episodes of Rescue Me, in addition to Xena: Warrior Princess, Arli$$, Homicide: Life on the Street, The Practice, Ally McBeal, Third Watch, House M.D., Prison Break, Golden Boy, Jodi Arias: Dirty Little Secret and the pilots for Burn Notice, Warehouse 13, Royal Pains, and Three Inches. 

Alexander was second vice president of the Directors Guild of America, but resigned only two months later following his arrest on child pornography charges. He was replaced by Brooke Kennedy.

Personal life
Alexander was born Jason Alexander in New York City, the only son of actress Jane Alexander and her first husband Robert, founder and former director of Living Stage Theatre Company. He is the stepson of director Ed Sherin.

Alexander married actress Maddie Corman in September 1998. They have three children: a daughter and twin sons. Alexander and Corman formerly lived in Dobbs Ferry, New York, but moved after Alexander's guilty plea.

Child pornography charges
On July 24, 2015, police discovered child pornography uploaded from an IP address assigned to Alexander's home in Dobbs Ferry. He was arrested on July 29 for the downloading and file sharing of child pornography. An investigation of his computers and hard drives in his home revealed files of minors engaged in sexual acts.

Alexander was charged with one count of promoting a sexual performance by a child and one count of possessing an obscene sexual performance by a child, facing a maximum of seven years in state prison. In January 2016, he pled guilty to the charges. In June 2016, he was sentenced to 10 years' probation; he must also register as a sex offender in New York.

Filmography

References

External links

1964 births
20th-century American male actors
AFI Conservatory alumni
American male film actors
American male stage actors
American male television actors
American people convicted of child pornography offenses
American television directors
Circle in the Square Theatre School alumni
Living people
Male actors from New York City
People from Dobbs Ferry, New York
The Field School alumni